Cordylepherus is a genus of beetles belonging to the family Malachiidae. The species of this genus are found in Europe.

Species
The following species are recognised in the genus Cordylepherus:
 Cordylepherus linearis (Morawitz, 1861)
 Cordylepherus oberthuerii (Uhagon, 1879)
 Cordylepherus sierranus (Evers, 1945)
 Cordylepherus sponsus (Abeille, 1883)
 Cordylepherus viridis (Fabricius, 1787)

References

Melyridae
Cleroidea genera